Jonestown is the third studio album by Swedish folk musician Sofia Talvik. Released in 2008, the album's title is a tribute to the 1978 Jonestown mass murder–suicide.

Track listing

References

External links
 Jonestown by Sofia Talvik on Bandcamp

2008 albums
Sofia Talvik albums